Ophraella californiana is a species of skeletonizing leaf beetle in the family Chrysomelidae. It is found in North America.

References

Galerucinae
Articles created by Qbugbot
Beetles described in 1986